William Mathews (1844-1928) was an American soldier who fought in the American Civil War. Mathews enlisted in 1861 at age 17 in  Baltimore, Maryland, under the name Henry Sivel. He served during the Civil War in Company E, 2nd Maryland Volunteer Infantry, rising from rrivate to commander of Company E. He was promoted to sergeant on May 15, 1863, and to first sergeant on June 22, 1863. On January 1, 1864, he reenlisted as a veteran volunteer, retaining his first sergeant rank. He was commissioned as a first lieutenant October 24, 1864, and a captain June 27, 1865. He was wounded twice, and captured once but quickly paroled. He mustered out of service on July 17, 1865.

Matthews received his country's highest award for bravery during combat, the Medal of Honor.} Mathews's medal was won for capturing prisoners at the Battle of the Crater, Virginia. He was honored with the award on July 10, 1892, under his nom de guerre, Henry Sivel, and the original Medal of Honor was issued under that name. A new medal was issued in 1900 under true name, William H. Mathews

Matthews was born in Devizes, Wiltshire, England, and emigrated with his family to Baltimore, MD, where he entered the service. After the war he married Emma Tisdale (1850-1938) with whom he had a daughter Edith Zillah Mathews (1882-1930) and a son William Henry Mathews, Jr. (1885-1885). He remained with Emma to his death at 83 in 1928 in Brooklyn.

Medal of Honor citation

See also
 List of American Civil War Medal of Honor recipients: M–P

References

Bibliography

 
 
 
 
 

1844 births
1928 deaths
19th-century American people
American Civil War recipients of the Medal of Honor
People of Maryland in the American Civil War
Military personnel from Baltimore
Union Army soldiers
United States Army Medal of Honor recipients
Burials in New York (state)